Dyadobacter soli  is a Gram-negative, aerobic and non-motile bacterium from the genus of Dyadobacter which has been isolated from farm soil near Daejeon in Korea. Dyadobacter soli has the ability to degrade starch

References

External links
Type strain of Dyadobacter soli at BacDive -  the Bacterial Diversity Metadatabase	

Cytophagia
Bacteria described in 2010